The Guatemala national badminton team represents Guatemala in international badminton team competitions. The Guatemalan team is controlled by the National Badminton Federation of Guatemala (Spanish: Federation Nacional de Badminton de Guatemala). Guatemala have only participated in the Sudirman Cup once in 1997.

The men's team were runners-up in the 2012 Pan Am Badminton Championships and have been third place in 2010 and 2016. The women's team finished in third place in 2016, 2018 and 2022. The mixed team were runners-up in the 1993 Pan Am Mixed Team Championships, which qualified them for the 1997 Sudirman Cup.

Guatemala made their Olympic badminton debut in 1996. The nation made history when national player Kevin Cordón reached the semifinals of the 2020 Summer Olympics and finished in 4th place after his defeat to Anthony Sinisuka Ginting.

Participation in BWF competitions

Sudirman Cup

Participation in Pan American Badminton Championships

Men's team
{| class="wikitable"
|-
! Year !! Result
|-
| 2010 ||  Third place
|-
| 2012 ||  Runner-up
|-
| 2016 ||  Third place
|-
| 2020 || Fourth place
|-
| 2022 || 5th place
|}Women's teamMixed team'''

Current squad 
The following players were selected to represent Guatemala at the 2022 Pan Am Male & Female Badminton Cup.

Men
Kevin Cordon
Ruben Castellanos
Yeison Esleiter Del Cid Alvarez
Jose Luis Granados Morales
Jonathan Solís
Anibal Marroquin
Christopher Alexander Martinez Salvador
Antonio Emanuel Ortiz

Women
Diana Corleto Soto
Karolina Orellana Ardon
Alejandra Jose Paiz Quan
Mariana Isabel Paiz Quan
Nikté Sotomayor

References

Badminton
National badminton teams
Badminton in Guatemala